The  are a collection of one-hundred Buddhist temples in the Tōkai region of central Honshū, Japan.

The Tōkai Hundred Kannon is made of up of the Mino Thirty-three Kannon in Gifu Prefecture, the Owari Thirty-three Kannon in western Aichi Prefecture, the Mikawa Thirty-three Kannon in eastern Aichi Prefecture, and Toyokawa Inari. Some religious observers go on a pilgrimage to visit these temples in a specific order.

See also
Tōkai Hundred Kannon
Mino Thirty-three Kannon
Owari Thirty-three Kannon
Toyokawa Inari
Pilgrimage

References

Buddhist temples in Aichi Prefecture
Buddhist temples in Gifu Prefecture